Tart is a 2001 American coming of age drama film written and directed by Christina Wayne and starring Dominique Swain, Brad Renfro, and Bijou Phillips. It follows a young woman at a preparatory school in 1980s New York City  and her ingratiation with a group of elite peers. It was released by Lionsgate in 2001.

Plot
Cat Storm is a teenager attending an elite preparatory school in 1980s Manhattan. Cat begins to fall in with the popular crowd at her prep school, abandoning her rebellious longtime friend, Delilah, who is expelled from the school. Cat surrounds herself with some of the school's most popular students, befriending Grace, an English exchange student, and attending holiday parties held by Peg which are often frequented by Kenny, an ephebophile who supplies cocaine to the teenagers and tries to have sex with the young men.

Amidst struggles at home between her divorced parents, Cat becomes attracted to William Sellers, a delinquent who comes from an abusive household, and who also is significantly less wealthy than his peers. William and Cat pursue a brief relationship, which he ends, leaving Cat distraught. After some of Cat's anti-semitic friends find out her father is Jewish, she is ostracized, and only accepted by the prim Eloise, who befriends her.

Hearing about a party hosted by Delilah on the beach in The Hamptons, Cat goes to stay the night with Eloise at her house, using it as an opportunity to attend the party. There, she confronts Delilah, and the two argue about Cat abandoning her, but make up. Delilah walks to a nearby gay bar operated by Kenny, where she tries to find a ride back to the city for her and Cat. While there, she stumbles upon William receiving oral sex from a male drug dealer. William chases after Delilah and confronts her in the woods on her way back to the beach, and the two get into an argument. He pushes her, causing her to hit her head on a rock. Delilah screams at him and threatens to press charges, and, in a panic, he beats her to death.

The following morning, after searching for Delilah, Cat discovers that Delilah's body has been found and William arrested. After school that afternoon, the paparazzi and reporters interview the students with questions about Delilah, and they all deem her "reckless" and have little to say of her. The film ends with Cat and her mother resolving their own familial conflict and her mother apologizing to her in Central Park.

Cast

Production
Though set in New York, the film was shot in New York City, New York and Toronto, Ontario, Canada in  1999. Anna Paquin was originally cast as Cat Storm. She dropped out of the lead role in favor of X-Men.

Reception
The reviewer for AllMovie wrote that "Tart is a straightforward depiction of self-possessed, spoiled teens, is the best argument yet for getting an after-school job in the late high school years". The reviewer for PopMatters wrote that "Tart is another in a long line of unoriginal attempts to explore one girl’s desire to fit in."

The reviewer for Cinema.com wrote that "The end really isn't an ending. It makes the audience wonder, that's it. There is no real plot, focus, direction or point. It is really not worth seeing." In contrast, the reviewer for the website Through the Shattered Lens actually liked the film, even though she called it a "massively flawed film".

Robert Pardi of TV Guide gave the film a middling review, writing: "In this blast at the privileged classes, yet another young social climber discovers the bitter accuracy of F. Scott Fitzgerald's observation about the very rich: "They are different from you and me"... But this expose doesn't elicit much sympathy for characters whose big dreams amount to little more than lust for a better grade of cashmere." Contactmusic.com gave the film a negative review, writing: "Not only does the provocative title of Tart mislead us, but the packaging features a lithe Dominique Swain on its covers, her schoolgirl skirt blowing up to expose her panties... The structure of the film is nonexistent (and in other words, there's little plot to hold together a series of oddball scenes), and the acting is perfunctory -- Mischa Barton's horrendous British accent a grating exercise in poor voice coaching and a director too in love with her own material to even notice."

A review published in The Massachusetts Daily Collegian was critical of the film, noting: "Writer-director Christina Wayne has so little clue about how to make a film that none of the relationships between seems remotely understandable. Characters float in and out with little connection to each; every scene the viewer needs to reestablish who everyone is in relation to one another."

Accolades

Home media
The film was released in DVD on April 23, 2002.  It is also included on streaming service, Prime Video.

References

External links
 
 
 

2000s coming-of-age drama films
2000s high school films
2001 romantic drama films
2000s teen drama films
2001 directorial debut films
2001 films
2001 independent films
2001 LGBT-related films
American coming-of-age drama films
American high school films
American independent films
American romantic drama films
American teen drama films
American teen LGBT-related films
Films about the upper class
Films set in New York City
Films shot in New York City
Films shot in Toronto
2000s English-language films
2000s American films